Mauger (or Malger according to the Gesta Normannorum Ducum) was born around 1019 near Dieppe. He was the younger son of Richard II, Duke of Normandy, and his second wife, Papia of Envermeu.

Mauger was brought up at the abbey of Fécamp as an eminent member of the ducal family, some of whom were later openly hostile to the accession of  Duke William II. On the death of his uncle Robert, Archbishop of Rouen in 1037, Mauger, who was only 18 was chosen to succeed him.

Mauger was apparently slow to instill loyalty to the young Duke William. In particular, he was opposed to the marriage of Duke William and Matilda of Flanders in 1049. His full brother William of Talou married a sister of the Count of Ponthieu and was appointed by William as Count of Arques, near Dieppe.

William of Talou, Mauger's brother, was defeated in a failed rebellion against their nephew Duke William in battle near Arques in 1053, after which the former fled into exile at Boulogne. Because of a perceived connection to his brother's rebellion, Mauger was deposed from his archbishopric at the council of Lisieux. Mauger was banished from Rouen to the Isle of Guernsey; he landed at a bay on the south coast that was named "Saint's Bay" in his honour.

Mauger's behaviour as a secular lord who had opposed papal authority enabled William to achieve his deposition on the grounds of inappropriate conduct at a provincial council held at Lisieux in 1054 or 1055, under the bishop Hugh of Lisieux (fl. 1049 - d. 17 July 1077). Stories relating to the end of Mauger's life in the Channel Islands were collected a century later by Wace (1100-1174), himself a native of Jersey. According to Wace, Mauger had a common law wife, who had borne him many children, and Mauger had devoted himself to hawking and reading occult sciences. The dethroned bishop is alleged to have abandoned himself to a pact with the devil and, having gone mad, drowned about 1055; his body was buried in a church at Cherbourg-Octeville. At the time of his death, Mauger is assumed to be 36. He was succeeded by Maurilius.

References

Sources

de Boüard, Michel. Guillaume le Conquérant.. Paris: Fayard, 1984.
Douglas, David C. William the Conqueror. University of California Press, Berkeley and Los Angeles, 1964.
Gesta Normannorum Ducum of William of Jumièges, Orderic Vitalis, and Robert of Torigni, edited and translated by Elisabeth M. C. Van Houts, Clarendon Press, Oxford, 1995.
Neveux, François. La Normandie des ducs aux rois, Xe-XIIe s. Rennes: Ouest-France, 1998.

11th-century Normans
Archbishops of Rouen
11th-century archbishops
Deaths by drowning
House of Normandy
People from Dieppe, Seine-Maritime